"It's a Sin to Tell a Lie" is a 1936 popular song written by Billy Mayhew, introduced early that year on records by many dance bands including Dick Robertson on the 78rpm record Champion 40106, and later popularized by Fats Waller on Victor 25342 and re-issued on Victor 20-1595. It was recorded in French by Cajun singer Cléoma Breaux in 1936 or 1937.  Four further recordings of the song were made in 1936, namely by Freddy Ellis and His Orchestra (April), Victor Young and His Orchestra (April), Elton Britt (September), Roy Smeck and His Serenaders and Vera Lynn.

Later versions
In all there are currently (2019) 95 versions, including:
The tune was revived in 1955 by Somethin' Smith and the Redheads, reaching number 7 on the Billboard charts in that year.
It was later a Top 40 Country hit for Slim Whitman, reaching #21 on the 'Top Country Singles' chart in 1971, from the album of the same name.
John Denver tells a story about the song and does a cover in his 1978 album, Live at the Sydney Opera House (RCA Victor VPL1-7167). 
Gerry Monroe (a number 13 hit in the UK Singles Chart in 1971) 
Billie Holiday
The Ink Spots
Brent Spiner
Floyd Vivino
Tony Bennett (US #99 in 1964) 
Bobbi Martin
Lenny Breau
Buddy Greco
Steve Goodman
The Quebe Sisters Band
Ann Breen
Jerry Murad and the Harmonicats
Bobby Vinton
Patti Page
Vera Lynn
George Maharis

Later uses
 Originally a waltz, during the British Dixieland Revival in the 1950s and 1960s this melody was often played in fast four/four tempo, notably recorded by the Kenny Ball Band.
 In the 2010 role-playing game Fallout: New Vegas, The Ink Spots rendition of the song can be heard playing on the in-game radio.
 A private recording exists of Elvis Presley singing part of the song over an orchestral recording by Nelson Riddle.
In season 2, episode 4 of the New Zealand TV series Seven Periods With Mr Gormsby, Dancing with the Staff, the titular character Mr Gormsby performs a version of the song at the school dance.

References

1936 songs
1955 singles
1971 singles
Slim Whitman songs
Patti Page songs